Jocara hemizonalis is a species of snout moth in the genus Jocara. It is found in South America.

References

Moths described in 1916
Jocara